Erica Lindbeck (born May 29, 1992) is an American voice actress known for her work with Bang Zoom!, Studiopolis, and NYAV Post in voicing characters in English-dubbed anime and video games. She was the voice of the Barbie dolls and merchandise, succeeding Kelly Sheridan, from 2015 to 2017, and is the voice of Loona in the animated web series Helluva Boss.

Career 
In anime, Lindbeck has voiced main characters Kaori Miyazono from Your Lie in April, Eli Ayase from the Love Live! series, Irene Urzaiz in The Asterisk War, Ibara Naruse from Coppelion, Kanae Kotonami from Skip Beat! and Oei from Miss Hokusai. She graduated from UCLA School of Theater, Film and Television in 2014. She and fellow voice actress Mela Lee host their own web series called Lindbeck and Lee with local voice actor guests. 

In 2018, Lindbeck voiced the character Felicia Hardy, otherwise known as the Black Cat, in Insomniac's Spider-Man video game. She later voiced as Ashley in WarioWare Gold.

In 2019, she voiced Cassie Cage in NetherRealm's Mortal Kombat 11 video game. Blaze the Cat and Omochao in Sonic the Hedgehog series. She also voiced Millie and Loona in 2019's Helluva Boss pilot, returning in the role of Loona for the continuation of the Helluva Boss series (2020–present).

Personal life
In February 2020, Lindbeck came out as bisexual. Lindbeck dated voice actor Billy Kametz until his death from colon cancer in June 2022.

Filmography

Anime

Animation

Film

Video games

Web

References

External links 

1992 births
Living people
Actresses from Boston
Actresses from Los Angeles
American video game actresses
American voice actresses
UCLA Film School alumni
21st-century American actresses
American bisexual actors
Bisexual actresses